Day of the Young Combatant is a non-official commemoration day, celebrated each March 29 in Chile. Its main purpose is remembering the assassination of brothers Rafael and Eduardo Vergara Toledo, which occurred on March 29, 1985 during the military dictatorship in Chile. The brothers were reportedly militants of a left-wing, anti-dictatorship insurgent group called MIR.

The commemoration is a call for human rights awareness and inquiry into several cases of extra judicial killings during the dictatorship. Violence often involves throwing rocks against buildings, vehicles, and police, as well as fire-bombing with Molotov cocktails. Given the general unrest-prone day, violence is directed not only against public and government buildings, but also against private property and commercial enterprises such as electrical wiring and power stations. These actions also serve as a cover-up for lootings and other deliberate violent actions done by organized groups. Most of the violent protests are in the Villa Francia neighborhood, in Estación Central Commune of western Santiago, the place where the Vergara Toledo family resides.  Whereas some commemorations in Chile involve peaceful marches, the Día del Joven Combatiente is well known to warrant violent action from hooded protesters, this has caused certain sectors to refer to the event as the "Día del Joven Delincuente" (Day of the Young Delinquent).

Generally, local media and government agencies have disseminated warnings to the public to stay indoors, expect power outages (particularly near the mentioned neighborhood "Villa Francia") and several institutions such as Universities end classes early for students to return home before nightfall, which is mostly when the violent attacks happen. It is also common to expect public transportation to be sparse due to frequent attacks on public buses.

A similarly violent-prone and disruptive day is September 11, the day of the 1973 coup d'état.

Background 

The Vergara-Toledo family lived in Villa Francia, and, due to their commitment to the population and worker organization, along with the fact that the sector stood out for the political organization and actions of its inhabitants, they were watched over by state agents.

During the afternoon of March 29, 1985, an operation was carried out by Carabineros de Chile in the  Las Rejas-April 5 intersection in the Central Station commune that ended up with the death of the Vergara-Toledo brothers. At the time, the press reported that brothers, Rafael Mauricio (18) and Eduardo Antonio (20) were students of the Liceo de Aplicación school and the Metropolitan University of Educational Sciences, respectively.

References

Civil disobedience
Remembrance days
Politics of Chile
March observances
Annual protests